Andrew Scott Bell (born 21 February 1966) is an Australian lawyer and judge currently serving as the Chief Justice of New South Wales. 

He was a Rhodes Scholar for New South Wales, practised as a barrister-at-law and an adjunct professor at the University of Sydney, and from 2019 was the President of the New South Wales Court of Appeal. On 7 March 2022, Bell was sworn in as the new Chief Justice of New South Wales, succeeding Tom Bathurst, who retired on 5 March 2022.

Early life

Bell is the son of economist Dr Harold Bell  and art historian Dr Pamela Bell . His father had bachelor's degrees in arts and economics, a Masters of Commerce from the University of Melbourne, and a doctorate from the London School of Economics, and become a well-known economist and public commentator. His mother holds an honours degree in fine arts, a master's degree and a doctorate.  She became the first curator of the University of Sydney's art collection and is highly regarded as an art historian. Bell grew up on the North Shore of Sydney and attended four schools, Balmoral Infants, Mosman Primary, Neutral Bay Opportunity and Sydney Grammar School. At Sydney Grammar he captained the school cricket team.

Academic life
Bell began his legal studies at the University of Sydney.  He graduated in 1989 with a Bachelor of Arts and a Bachelor of Laws with first class honours in both degrees, as well as receiving the University Medal in both. Bell also received the Sydney University Convocation Medal. He obtained a prize in Roman law studying under Arthur Emmett (who subsequently became a judge of the same Court). He was also a medallist in Economic History and Law at the University of Sydney (where he was a resident from 1985 to 1989 at St Paul's College). He became a member of the College Council in 2004, and continued to serve as a member until 2013.  He also served as deputy chairman between 2010 and 2013.  He was later in 2018 to commission a sculpture by Ayako Saito called “Heaven’s Door” for the college.

In 1990, Bell was a Rhodes Scholar for New South Wales to undertake a Bachelor of Civil Law at the University of Oxford. He subsequently completed his doctorate at the University of Oxford under the supervision of Adrian Briggs, who Bell subsequently worked with on various pieces of transnational litigation. The following year he earned his doctorate from Oxford University. His thesis formed the basis for his book Forum Shopping and Venue in Transnational Litigation published by Oxford University Press. He was later to become a selection committee member with the Australian Rhodes Scholar's Association.

Legal career

In 1990–1991, Bell was the Associate to the then Chief Justice of the High Court, Anthony Mason. It was there he met his wife, Joanna Bird, the Associate to Justice Michael McHugh. He was admitted as a barrister in 1995 and read with Phil Greenwood in Eleven Wentworth chambers.  He took silk in 2006 as a Senior Counsel. He had a broad national practice and appeared in both trials and appeals, as well as an extensive international arbitration practice.  He appeared in more than 30 High Court appeals. 
He was Treasurer, then Senior Vice President of the New South Wales Bar Association, a past chairman of the Professional Conduct Committee of that Association and was for many years the editor of that Association's journal titled "Bar News".

He was twice the chairman of his chambers, Eleven Wentworth Chambers.  He was a member of "Wentworth Wombats", described in his swearing-in speech as being "one of the finest cricket teams ever to leave these shores but never to taste success".

In 2008 he was appointed an adjunct professor at Sydney University Law School, where he taught private international law. Bell is a co-author of Nygh's Conflict of Laws in Australia.

Bell is a Fellow of the Australian Academy of Law. His notable legal cases have included acting for Qantas against Rolls-Royce, the Rinehart children in trust litigation against Gina Rinehart, and for Channel 7 in relation to cases arising from Australian Federal Police raids.

Sculpture by the Sea

Bell was a long-time board member of the Sydney Sculpture by the Sea exhibition.  He was a board member from 2006, and became its chair between 2010 and 2016. He is credited with being instrumental in developing the event from an organisation barely able to stage two large exhibits in Sydney and Perth, to a well established body regarded as the peak body for sculpture in Australia. He introduced key changes such as a universal minimum income for artists in the Sydney exhibition, and later covering the costs of the heavy installation equipment for artists in both Sydney and Perth.  He also developed initiatives such as "Sculpture at Barangaroo", held in 2016 and 2017, as well as the Sydney Sculpture Conference at the Sydney Opera House.

Bell would attend opening nights in Cottesloe wearing a Hawaiian shirt. In 2011 he escorted Crown Prince Frederik and Crown Princess Mary at the Sydney exhibition.  Bell was later alleged to have said that his meeting with the Crown Princess was the highlight of their trip to Australia in 2011. At the 20th anniversary dinner for Sculpture by the Sea in 2016, Bell took the stage with a photograph of the Crown Princess with himself looming in the background and exclaimed how delighted the princess looked at seeing him.

Judicial life

Bell was appointed as President of the NSW Court of Appeal on 28 February 2019. As President, he was an official member of the Judicial Commission of New South  Wales.  On 4 June 2019, he was sworn in as an Administrator of the State of New South Wales.  He has handed down decisions in the Chris Gayle defamation appeal, and the lead judgment in Searle v Commonwealth of Australia, an important case on the constitutional doctrine of "fettering" of discretionary powers of Government.

References

 

1966 births
Living people
Alumni of Magdalen College, Oxford
Australian Senior Counsel
Judges of the Supreme Court of New South Wales
Presidents of the NSW Court of Appeal
Sydney Law School alumni
University of Sydney alumni
21st-century Australian judges
Australian Rhodes Scholars